Pedro Larrañaga Arana (1 July 1885 – 26 February 1909) was a Spanish footballer who played as a defender for Athletic Club (now known as Athletic Bilbao). He was one of the co-founders of Athletic Club in 1901 and was part of the team that won the 1902 Copa de la Coronación, the first national championship disputed in Spain.

Biography
On 5 September 1901, he was one of the 33 members who signed the documents that officially established the Athletic Club at the historic meeting in Café García. He was then one of the first football players of the newly created Basque team, with whom heplayed several friendly matches against city rivals Bilbao Football Club) in the Hippodrome of Lamiako.

In 1902, the two rivals agreed to join the best players of each club to face the Bordeaux-based side Burdigala. This temporary merge became known as Club Bizcaya and Larrañaga ousted Bilbao FC's defenders to be part of the first-ever line-up of the Bizcaya team that faced Burdigala on 9 March, contributing to a clean-sheet in an 0–2 win in France. Three weeks later, on 31 March 1902, he was again in Bizcaya's starting XI for the return fixture at Lamiako, the first visit by a foreign team to Bilbao, where he formed a defensive partnership with Alfred Mills, Athletic's only foreign player, and together they helped to a clean-sheet in a 7–0 win over the French side. 

Together with Juan Astorquia, Armand Cazeaux, William Dyer and Walter Evans, he was part of the team Bizcaya team that won the first national championship disputed in Spain, 1902 Copa de la Coronación, the forerunner for the Copa del Rey. Larrañaga featured in the final in which the Basque side defeated FC Barcelona 2–1.

In the 1902–03 season, Larrañaga returned to his native town of Portugalete where he continued to play sports, in particular, football. Larrañaga started the 1903–04 season with his hometown team. He even played a few friendly matches with local clubs such as Athletic de Portugalete, and notably, on 13 March 1904, he played against his former club Athletic Club. Therefore, he was again invited to play for the Basque team and was part of the team that won the 1904 Copa del Rey, which Athletic won without playing a single match since their opponents failed to turn up.

Death
He died young in 1909, at the age of 23, for unknown reasons. He was 23 years old and had two brothers, Marcos and Adolfo.

Honours
Club Bizcaya
Copa de la Coronación:
Winners (1): 1902

Athletic Club
Copa del Rey:
Winners (1): 1904

References

1885 births
1909 deaths
Spanish footballers
Athletic Bilbao footballers
Association football defenders
Footballers from Bilbao